Adrian Friedrich Wilhelm Julius Ludwig von Verdy du Vernois (19 July 1832 – 30 September 1910), often given the short name of Verdy, was a German general and staff officer, chiefly noted both for his military writings and his service on Helmuth von Moltke the Elder's staff during the Franco-Prussian War.

Life and career
Verdy was born in Freystadt, Province of Silesia, and entered the Prussian Army in 1850. After some years of regimental service he came to the attention of Graf Moltke, the newly appointed Chief of the Prussian General Staff, and at the outbreak of the Austro-Prussian War (1866) he was appointed major on the staff of the Second Army (commanded by Crown Prince Frederick). He took part in the campaign on the upper Elbe and participated in the Battle of Königgrätz, which saw the defeat of the Austrians.

Promoted shortly after this to the rank of lieutenant-colonel, in 1867 Verdy was placed at the head of the intelligence section of the general staff, becoming thereby one of Moltke's principal confidential assistants. In this capacity he served at the headquarters of the German army throughout the Franco-Prussian War (1870–71), and became known as one of Moltke's famed "demigods."

At the close of the war he continued to serve on the general staff, and also lectured at the Prussian Military Academy. It was in the latter position that he developed the system of thorough tactical education which is considered the abiding result of his work. His method may be studied in English translations of his Studies in Troop-leading, and may be summarized as the assumption of an actual military situation on the actual ground, followed by critical discussion of the successive measures that a commander, whether of a brigade, division or larger force, should take in the sequel, given his orders and his knowledge of the general situation. Moltke's own series of tactical problems, extending from 1859 to 1889, contributed very powerfully, of course, to the education of the selected young officers who passed through Verdy's hands, but Moltke dealt rather with a great number of separate problems, while Verdy developed in detail the successive events and ruling ideas of a whole day's or week's work in the same units. Moltke therefore may be said to have developed the art of forming correct ideas and plans, Verdy that of applying them, but these are after all merely tendencies, not sharply divided schemes, in the teaching of Prussian staff officers during the years of intellectual development between 1870 and 1888. In all this Moltke, Verdy and Paul Bronsart von Schellendorff worked in close co-operation.

In 1876 Verdy was promoted to Generalmajor, from 1879 to 1883 he held an important position in the ministry of war, and in 1881 he was promoted lieutenant-general. In 1887 he became governor of Strasbourg, in 1888 was promoted to General of the Infantry.  From 1889 to 1890 he served as Prussian Minister of War, after which he retired from the active list. In 1894 the University of Königsberg made him a Dr. Phil, honoris causa.

Julius von Verdy du Vernois died in 1910 aged 78.

Honours and awards

Notes

References

Dupuy, Trevor N. A Genius for War: The German Army and General Staff, 1807-1945, NOVA Publications, 1991, 

1832 births
1910 deaths
German people of French descent
People from Kożuchów
German untitled nobility
German military writers
German male non-fiction writers
German military personnel of the Franco-Prussian War
Prussian people of the Austro-Prussian War
People from the Province of Silesia
Generals of Infantry (Prussia)
Academic staff of the University of Königsberg
Burials at the Invalids' Cemetery
Recipients of the Iron Cross, 1st class
Recipients of the Pour le Mérite (civil class)
Recipients of the Pour le Mérite (military class)
Recipients of the Military Merit Order (Bavaria)
Grand Crosses of the Order of Franz Joseph
Grand Crosses of the Order of Aviz
Knights Grand Cross of the Order of Saints Maurice and Lazarus
Recipients of the Order of the Crown (Italy)
Recipients of the Order of the White Eagle (Russia)
Recipients of the Order of St. Anna, 2nd class
Recipients of the Order of St. Vladimir, 4th class
Recipients of the Military Merit Cross (Mecklenburg-Schwerin)